Manpreet Singh, professionally known as Singga, is an Indian singer, songwriter, actor, rapper, lyricist, composer, producer and Director associated with Punjabi Music and Punjabi cinema. He is best known for his song "Badnam", "Sheh", "Shadow", "Photo", "Jatt Di Clip 2" and "Brotherhood" in punjabi music industry. He made his acting debut with movie, Jora: The Second Chapter.

Personal life

Singga was born as Manpreet Singh on 26 February 1992 in Janglaina, Hoshiarpur in the state of Punjab, India. He belongs to a Sikh Rajput family.Manpreet Singh completes his graduation and Post-Graduation in M.A History.

Career

Singga works in variety of music styles,  including  Punjabi,Pop, Bhangra, Reggae, Romantic, R&B,Filmi and HipHop.Singga began his music career as lyricist with song "Badnam" sung by Mankirt Aulakh released in September 2017.In December 2018, his debut song "Jatt Di Clip 2" was released under the banner of Single Track Studios.In February 2021, his first romantic song "Teri Load Ve" with Urvashi Rautela was released by Speed Records.

Singga got his breakthrough in Punjabi Cinema with his debut movie "Jora:The Second Chapter" starring Deep Sidhu, Dharmendra, Mahie Gill, Japji Khaira, Sardar Sohi, Gugu Gill and Yaad Grewal.

Discography

Filmography

References

External links
 

Living people
1992 births
Punjabi-language songwriters
People from Hoshiarpur
Bhangra (music) musicians
Filmi singers
Indian male pop singers
21st-century Indian male singers
21st-century Indian singers
Indian male playback singers
21st-century Indian male actors
Male actors from Punjab, India